Niall M. O'Callaghan (born May 21, 1963, in County Cork, Ireland) is an American Thoroughbred horse trainer.

O'Callaghan became involved in the sport of Thoroughbred horse racing as an apprentice jockey in his native Ireland. In 1982 he emigrated to the United States where he studied at Miami Dade Community College in Florida. In 1988, he went to work as an assistant to trainer Thomas J. Skiffington, Jr. In 1990, O'Callaghan set up his own public stable, handling fifteen horses from prominent owner, Frank Stronach. With John Gunther's colt, Wall Street Dancer, O'Callaghan won his first Graded stakes race, the 1992 Pan American Handicap at Gulfstream Park Racetrack.

References
 Niall M. O'Callaghan at the NTRA

1963 births
Living people
American horse trainers
Sportspeople from County Cork